Enteromius urostigma is a species of ray-finned fish in the genus Enteromius which is found in the rivers flowing from Lake Tanganyika and the Lualaba River system.

References 

 

Enteromius
Taxa named by George Albert Boulenger
Fish described in 1917
Endemic fauna of the Democratic Republic of the Congo